Lake Virginia is a lake in Carver and Hennepin counties, in the U.S. state of Minnesota.

Lake Virginia was named after the state of Virginia, the native home of a share of the early settlers.

See also
List of lakes in Minnesota

References

Lakes of Minnesota
Lakes of Carver County, Minnesota
Lakes of Hennepin County, Minnesota